Snow White's Enchanted Wish is a dark ride at the Disneyland, Tokyo Disneyland, and Disneyland Paris theme parks, and formerly at the Magic Kingdom. Located in Fantasyland, it is one of the few remaining attractions that was operational on Disneyland's opening day in 1955, although it has seen several different redesigns over its history. The ride's story is based on Disney's 1937 film, Snow White and the Seven Dwarfs, their first animated feature film.

The now-closed ride at the Magic Kingdom and the version at Tokyo Disneyland are named Snow White's Adventures, until the Magic Kingdom version got its redesign in 1994 and was known as Snow White's Scary Adventures, and the Disneyland Paris version is called Blanche Neige et les Sept Nains: L'Attraction. The Disneyland version was originally known as Snow White and Her Adventures before its redesign in 1983, where it became known as Snow White's Scary Adventures until 2020. The attraction's current name was announced in late 2020, with the latest version of the ride opening at Disneyland in 2021.

History
Snow White's Enchanted Wish opened on Disneyland's opening day as Snow White and Her Adventures. Imagineers designed the ride so that guests assumed the viewpoint of the main character, Snow White. Few people understood this concept, and some wondered why Snow White was not featured in the ride.

During the 1983 season, all of the Fantasyland dark rides were completely redesigned as part of a large overhaul of the area. This attraction, then renamed Snow White's Scary Adventures, and the other dark rides were modified to include the main characters of the films they represented. Snow White appeared once in the attraction. The outdoor facade was made to resemble the Evil Queen's castle from the movie.

When the Witch offered guests the poisoned apple in one scene, guests frequently tried (and sometimes managed) to steal the apple and bring it home as a souvenir. When Fantasyland was reopened in 1983, they solved the issue by replacing it with an image of an apple projected by means of a parabolic mirror.

Magic Kingdom's original version of this ride, like their early version of Peter Pan's Flight, also put the guests in the role of the story's main character (Snow White). Around Christmas of 1994, a less frightening version of the ride took its place; appearances of Snow White were also added. The redesigned ride took some cues from the version at Disneyland Paris, including increasing the capacity of each vehicle from four to six passengers. On February 23, 2012, Disney announced that the ride would close on May 31. Two years after its closure, another Snow White attraction opened, Seven Dwarfs Mine Train.

On January 7, 2020, the attraction at Disneyland closed for an extended refurbishment. Walt Disney Imagineering installed new scenes and updated the attraction's audio and visual technology. Its exterior was also refreshed to complement the nearby Sleeping Beauty Castle. On December 21, 2020, the film's 83rd anniversary, Disney announced that the ride would be renamed Snow White's Enchanted Wish, and would include state-of-the-art audio and visual technology, including new music, LED black lighting, laser projections, and a new animation system. Other new elements include a dancing Snow White, the scent of pies baking, a new queue with storybooks, and the evil Queen’s collection of spell books and bubbling potions. The ride officially reopened to the public on April 30, 2021, the same day Disneyland allowed guests to return to the park following its lengthy closure due to the COVID-19 pandemic.

Attraction summary

Disneyland

1955 version
The version of the Snow White dark ride that opened along with Disneyland on July 17, 1955—uniquely titled Snow White and her Adventures—was designed by Claude Coats and Ken Anderson, both of whom were largely responsible for the look of the 1937 feature film. The original ride was shorter than the version that replaced it (at a duration of approximately ninety seconds), contained cruder animation and audio, and relied far more on two-dimensional plywood "flats" for scenery than any other iteration of the attraction. Quite notably, Snow White herself did not appear in the ride, as riders themselves were meant to assume the role and perspective of the titular heroine. Contemporary opening-day dark rides Mr. Toad's Wild Ride and Peter Pan's Flight similarly lacked in-ride appearances of their titular characters, but in the case of Snow White in particular, the concept eluded most guests, leaving many confused as to why Snow White did not appear. In response, a single Snow White figure was eventually added to one of the interior scenes in the early 1970s, as photographic evidence suggests.

As with the Peter Pan and Mr. Toad rides, the loading queue of the original Snow White attraction was set within a wide opening in the front wall of the show building, and its exterior façade consisted of colorful, patterned canvas awnings akin to those of a medieval jousting tournament. (This aesthetic was uniform across the entirety of Fantasyland prior to 1983.) Spanning the entire front wall of the space housing the ride's interior was a detailed mural illustrating most of the scenes in the attraction, as well as the cast of the 1937 film. Directly in front of the mural was the ride's loading line, where guests boarded one-seat ride vehicles embellished to appear as hand-carved wooden benches rendered in the style of the Dwarfs' furniture from the film. The vehicles were replaced with two-seat versions in the 1960s.

Upon release by a ride operator, guests were shuttled forth and made a ninety-degree turn toward the gaping, wood-timber entrance to the Dwarfs' diamond mine at the far-left end of the mural. All was dark at first, but riders soon found themselves venturing through underground tunnels fitted with numerous rows of wooden beams. Here, gems of every color studded the rock walls and shone brilliantly under ultraviolet light. Guests soon approached a forced-perspective mural of a seemingly endless mineshaft continuing into the unseen distance before turning around and passing into the mine's gem vault. The huge vault door was held open by Dopey (rendered as a plywood flat), who peeked out from behind it, grinning at riders as they passed. Inside the vault was the Dwarfs' vast stock of precious jewels, piled high into glistening mounds within kegs and mine carts. Guests continued deeper into the mine, where the other dwarfs were seen picking away at ore by lantern light to an instrumental variant of the Dig-a Dig Dig song. Heading to the left, riders encountered Dopey once again (this time a fully dimensional animated figure like the other six dwarfs), who pointed worriedly to a wooden sign reading, "BEWARE OF THE WITCH."

Guests then passed under a final set of wooden timbers, exiting the diamond mine into the serene forest, where many animals such as deer, birds, and rabbits looked on from behind the trees. Ahead was a fork in the road marked by a wooden sign pointing in one direction to the Dwarfs' cottage and to the Queen's castle in the other. For a moment guests approached a forced-perspective mural of the distant woodland cottage, but turned instead into the direction of the castle. The scene then quickly shifted from a peaceful and pleasant forest into one of gnarled tree roots, dead vines, and muddy colors as riders passed under two vultures perched overhead. Guests then turned left toward the open entrance to the sinister stone castle and passed through. Directly ahead, within the castle's dim interior, was a passage leading back outside, where another wooden sign signified the Dwarfs' cottage. As guests advanced toward the open doorway, however, a wrought-iron portcullis slammed shut in front of it, blocking the way out. Ahead, at the end of a dark, straight corridor, a skeleton chained to the wall rattled as guests approached it, moaning, "Go back..."

Riders then veered away under a stone arch and saw the hunched shadow of the lurking Witch right in front of them, creeping across a stone wall plastered with a large spider web. Hanging strings simulating cob webs brushed against guests' faces as they passed under another arch, and rounding a sharp turn, riders encountered the Witch herself at her cauldron. Stationed near her massive spell book, the cloaked peddler held a newly poisoned apple over her brew by its stem. She turned to face guests as they approached her, croaking, "Have an apple, dearie?" before riders were jolted away into a dark corner. Guests came face to face with the old hag once more in the next chamber; this time she emerged from behind a large stone column, again offering her deadly fruit as she delivered a grim laugh. Guests then escaped the dungeon by crashing through a solid masonry wall, and, after a short interval of darkness, found themselves threading through the frightful woods. Here were many looming and gnarled trees, each with a grotesque, menacing face embedded into its bark; the trees' arm-like branches were fixed in dramatic clawing and grasping postures. Beyond the forest was the thatched-roof home of the Seven Dwarfs, complete with warm light emanating from its windows. As riders drew near the inviting cottage, its front door swung open only to reveal the Witch inside, poisoned apple still in hand. Finally, in a scene mirroring the climax of the film, riders approached a tall cliff on which the old peddler was seen one last time. She cackled maniacally, attempting to pry a boulder onto guests from above. Just as the huge rock began to tilt forward, however, the wicked crone was struck down by a simulated bolt of lightning, meeting her demise with a wretched shriek just before guests escaped through a camouflaged set of crash doors within the rock surface below her. After a final short stretch of darkness, guests returned to the loading area to disembark.

In January 1961, a number of updates were made to the Snow White dark ride by a team of Imagineers headed by Yale Gracey. These included improved, rebuilt figures of the Witch replacing several of the cruder models present on opening day, fully dimensional trees in the dark forest scene replacing the original plywood flats, and various new details such as ambient sound effects. Snow White and her Adventures ceased operation in December 1981 for a major overhaul coinciding with the New Fantasyland project, a dramatic reimagining of Fantasyland where most of its attractions and architecture were improved with far more intricate theming and superior technology. The updated Snow White attraction, Snow White's Scary Adventures, opened in May 1983.

1983 version

Guests entered the ride building through the Evil Queen's castle. Overlooking the entrance was a high window whose curtains are parted every few minutes by the Evil Queen. A metal, gold-colored apple next to a spellbook that was within reach of guests standing in the queue. Touching the apple caused the disembodied voice of the Queen to cackle menacingly. Guests wound their way through a dungeon inside the castle, passing by a book of poisons. The book read, "One taste of the poisoned apple and the victim's eyes will close forever in the Sleeping Death." Like most of the dark rides, the boarding area was dominated by a large mural depicting characters from the movie.

The ride vehicles resemble mine carts and feature the names of each of the Seven Dwarfs, much like their beds in the film. When guests boarded the ride vehicles, they entered the Dwarfs' cottage first. Here, the music and yodeling from "The Silly Song" can be heard, while birds, chipmunks, and other forest creatures perform housekeeping tasks such as hanging a clothesline and washing the dishes. Guests passed Snow White followed by some of her animal friends climbing the stairs to the second floor of the cottage.  The guests then moved past the Dwarfs, who are performing "The Silly Song".

When guests left the cottage, they passed by the Queen who says "Soon I'll be fairest in the land." They then enter the Dwarfs' diamond mine, which is full of jewels of many colors. Guests passed under a branch with two vultures perched on it and enter the Queen's castle. There, they see the Queen as she stands before a mirror with her back to the guests and beautiful reflection saying, "Magic Mirror on the wall..." She then turns and faces the guests. They see that she has become an ugly, green-eyed, toothless witch with a wart on her nose. "With this disguise, I'll fool them all!" she adds. This effect is achieved by two models—one queen and one witch—rotating on different sides of the 'mirror', which is actually a sheet of transparent glass. Projections and LED lights created the effect of cobwebs and electricity running through the walls. Guests continued to pass through the castle laden with skeletons. Nearby, the Witch was accompanied by a raven in a dungeon where she was creating a poisoned apple for Snow White. She headed for the Dwarfs' cottage in a small boat.

Guests wound their way through a menacing forest. Here, trees had ugly faces and branches like talons or grasping hands. Bats flew everywhere and logs resembled snapping crocodiles. The guests then turned toward the Seven Dwarfs' cottage. The door opened to reveal the Witch, who offered the guests the apple. Guests turned towards a mountainside where the Dwarfs pursued the Witch. Nearby, the Witch tried to roll a boulder down the mountain to crush the Dwarfs below. However, a strike of lightning caused her to tumble to her death; her scream was heard as guests exited the area.

Returning to the boarding and debarkation area, guests passed a giant book featuring a silhouette of Snow White and her Prince with his horse as they wander away towards a castle. The words at the bottom of this picture read, "And they lived happily ever after." The guests then disembarked from the ride vehicles and return to Fantasyland.

The installation at Disneyland was manufactured by Arrow Development.

This version of the attraction closed in January 2020.

2021 version
Walt Disney Imagineering's intention was to make the ride less scary and to balance the "three core audiences" of adults, teens, and kids. They went on to say that the latest version of the ride also tells the complete story instead of the ride's 1983 version, which mostly concluded on a cliffhanger, and that the new ending makes it clear that Snow White and the Prince are the ones who lived "happily ever after". The project had an unlikely start when Walt Disney Imagineering intern David Borning brought in a model and sold the office on the idea.

Guests once again enter the ride building through the Evil Queen's castle, now repainted and refurbished to complement the color scheme of Sleeping Beauty Castle. No longer can guests go up to the gold-colored apple and hear the Witch's evil cackle, now replaced by a book telling the story of Snow White. As guests make their way into the queue, the once-resided dungeon has been reimagined into Snow White's room containing various outfits, books, another storybook telling her story, and doves. The boarding area is now refreshed with more greenery, forest creatures, and a new projection on the window of the Dwarfs' cottage showing the silhouettes of Snow White and the Dwarfs dancing.

The guests' journey begins as they enter the Dwarfs' cottage first. Here, the music and yodeling from "The Silly Song" can be heard. The added scent of apple pie fills the cottage while the guests move past Snow White's animal friends along the staircase as they watch the Dwarfs, who are performing "The Silly Song" with Snow White now dancing alongside Sneezy and Dopey.

As guests leave the cottage and into the woods passing by the Evil Queen peering into the cottage saying "These Dwarfs can't hide Snow White from me." The guests pass through the woods as the projection shows the Dwarfs marching to work while singing "Heigh-Ho". As guests enter the Dwarfs' mine Dopey is spotted waving at guests in a mine cart with diamonds in his eyes. The mine is now shimmering with shiny diamonds, new projections, and Doc admiring and inspecting diamonds.

Exiting the mine, guests pass under the two vultures and into the Evil Queen's castle. There, they see the Queen as she stands before her Magic Mirror with her back to the guests. She then turns and faces the guests. They see that she has become the Evil Witch. The guests then make their way through the laboratory passing by chemicals and experiments made by the Evil Queen. Guests now encounter Witch is accompanied by her raven in a dungeon where she is creating a poisoned apple for Snow White with enhanced lighting and projections added. Passing by the castle tunnel where the Witch previously appeared on a boat now features a magic mirror projection showing Snow White taking a bite of the poison apple only to have the mirror shatter into pieces right after.

Now relocated and altered, guests come across the Dwarfs pursuing the Witch on the cliff, now featuring a projection showing the Witch running from the Dwarfs. Turning the corner, entering the forest shows the Prince giving the kiss to Snow White to reawaken her from the poison apple. As guests make their way towards the cottage lies the storybook saying "True Love's Kiss Awakened Snow White and the good Dwarfs danced for joy." Now featuring the all new ending scene, guests pass by Snow White reunited with all her animal friends with her Prince standing with his horse awaiting her. 

Returning to the loading/unloading area, guests pass the giant book featuring a silhouette of Snow White and her Prince with his horse as they wander away towards a castle. The words at the bottom of this picture read, "And they lived happily ever after" and "Snow White's wish had come true!" The guests then disembark from the ride vehicles and return to Fantasyland.

Magic Kingdom

The original version of the ride at Magic Kingdom in Florida which ran from 1971 to 1994 was very different, and arguably more frightening. Snow White was not seen at all, and the Dwarfs showed up only briefly in one scene. There were also seven witch figures in this version, whereas there were only six in the 1994 version. The queue was similar to Tokyo Disneyland's current queue. It featured the Dwarfs' mine, with their cottage visible in the distance. Guests began by entering the castle in a scene very much like the 1994 ride; however, there was no part where Snow White was seen cleaning. Instead, riders saw a side of the Dwarfs' cottage as "I'm Wishing" played in the background. Upon entering, with the queen watching in a nearby window, the guests saw a mirror, but not the magic one. The Queen still transformed into the Witch by saying, "Mirror Mirror on the wall, I am the fairest one of all!" and was still seen at the cauldron preparing the poisoned apple. The riders then "crashed" through the dungeon walls and escaped through the forest with the tree monsters and the crocodile logs (still bumping into the Witch, who was on a boat). Soon, guests arrived in the Dwarfs' cottage to see the animals peering in at them. They then passed the Dwarfs (in their only appearance) walking up the stairs to their room to investigate a frightening shadow. The Witch was waiting in the doorway with the apple. Riders would then exit the cottage, back into the woods, and pass by two ominous vultures. The final scene was the diamond mine, where the Witch appeared several more times. Her final appearance was on top of a doorway, pushing an enormous jewel onto the riders (in much the same way as she tries to crush the Dwarfs with a huge rock near the end of the film). Riders would then enter a room full of flashing cartoon-like strobe lights (similar to Alice in Wonderland at Disneyland in California prior to 1984) with the Witch's cackling echoing in their ears. Guests then disembarked. Ginny Tyler did the voice of the Witch in this version, while Mel Blanc, Paul Frees, Hal Smith, Hans Conried, and Dallas McKennon did the voices of the Dwarfs.

On October 14, 1994, the Magic Kingdom attraction was closed in order to undergo a redesign in order to be similar to the Disneyland version, but in a different order with a few new scenes. The attraction re-opened on December 16, 1994 with a much lighter tone. Guests boarded the ride by a mural depicting the characters of Snow White and the Seven Dwarfs, and began their ride in the Queen's courtyard where Snow White was seen working outside. The Queen watched her (and the guests) from her window. Inside the castle, the scene was similar to the Disneyland version (with the Queen turning into the Witch and working at the cauldron), although the Magic Mirror (voiced by Tony Jay) was added who said, "Alas! Snow White is the fairest one of all," to which the Queen (voiced by Louise Chamis) replied, "Never!" The ride continued into the forest where the Huntsman (a newly added character in this version of the attraction, and voiced by Peter Renaday) tells Snow White to "run away and never come back! Go!" and strobe lighting effects that resembled lightning lit up Snow White running through the tree monsters, and then into the Dwarfs' cottage where the "Dwarfs' Yodel Song" played. In a new scene, the riders then passed the Witch giving Snow White the apple, then emerged from the cottage as she gloated that she was the fairest one of all. From there, guests rode through the mine where the two of the Dwarfs (Bashful and Sneezy) called to them to stop the Witch. After the scene where the Witch tried to drop a rock on the dwarfs, there was a new ending with the Prince waking Snow White and then leading her away on his horse as two of the Dwarfs waved goodbye. Dopey was seen above the bridge, waving to all the passengers. Guests then traveled through the open doors under the bridge and disembarked.

Tokyo Disneyland
Tokyo Disneyland represents a mix of the American versions at the time of the park's opening, although it is mostly based on the original Walt Disney World version. It begins in the castle where the Queen transforms into the Witch, moving on to the dungeon and passing her on the boat. After going through the forest, guests enter the cottage where the Dwarfs perform The Silly Song, with Snow White watching from the stairs, similar to the 1983 Disneyland version. Exiting the cottage, guests find the Witch outside waiting for them, then enter the mines, which is portrayed as a mix of both American versions. The cart approaches the cottage again and encounters the Witch with the apple. The ride ends like Disneyland's 1983 version, with the Dwarfs and Witch on the cliff, although without the "happy ending" afterwards.

Disneyland Park (Paris)
Disneyland Park (Paris)'s ride is nearly identical to the 1983 Disneyland version, the only major difference being that it includes a happy ending similar to the 1994 Walt Disney World version. However, in this variation, instead of passing the Prince waking Snow White, then Dopey on an arch, all the Dwarfs, the Prince and Snow White are on an arch, with Snow White sitting on the Prince's horse and waving the guests goodbye. To the guests' left, the Prince's castle is seen above the clouds. The ride is called Blanche Neige et les Sept Nains, French for Snow White and the Seven Dwarfs.

Gallery

See also
List of Disneyland attractions
List of Magic Kingdom former attractions
List of Tokyo Disneyland attractions
List of Disneyland Park (Paris) attractions

References

External links
Disneyland website
Tokyo Disneyland website
Disneyland Park (Paris) website

Amusement rides introduced in 1955
Amusement rides introduced in 1971
Amusement rides introduced in 1983
Amusement rides introduced in 2021
Amusement rides introduced in 1992
Amusement rides manufactured by Arrow Dynamics
Disneyland
Magic Kingdom
Tokyo Disneyland
Works based on Snow White
Disneyland Park (Paris)
Dark rides
Audio-Animatronic attractions
Snow White (franchise) in amusement parks
Fantasyland
Amusement rides that closed in 2012
Amusement rides that closed in 2020
1955 establishments in California
2020 disestablishments in California
1971 establishments in Florida
2012 disestablishments in Florida
1983 establishments in Japan
1992 establishments in France
Fiction about witchcraft